Lichau Creek is an  southwest-flowing stream in Sonoma County, California, United States, which flows through the town of Penngrove and discharges into the Petaluma River.

The original name of the creek is O'Hara Creek and is named after the settler, John O'Hara, who purchased and owned the land through which the creek flows. O'Hara was born in 1833 in County Sligo, Ireland and settled in Penngrove sometime between 1852 and 1857 and died in 1911 at the age of 78 years. The October 26, 1904, Santa Rosa Republican refers to this creek as O'Hara Creek.

Course
The creek springs from the western side of Sonoma Mountain between Copeland Creek and Lynch Creek.  Descending initially to the west, it crosses under Sonoma Mountain Road and passes north of Stony Butte.  After crossing East Railroad Avenue and Petaluma Hill Road, it flows under the Northwestern Pacific Railroad tracks.  It immediately bends southward and parallels the tracks through Penngrove, crossing Adobe Road and Main Street.

On the northern outskirts of Petaluma, it crosses Ely Road and turns southwestward, crossing Old Redwood Highway, the North McDowell Boulevard Extension, U.S. 101, and Stony Point Road to reach the Petaluma River.

Flora and fauna
A 1968 survey of Lichau Creek found algae, duckweed, cattails, dragonflies, dipterous insects, caddisflies, frogs, steelhead trout, and sticklebacks living in the creek.

Bridges
At least three bridges span the creek:

See also
 List of watercourses in the San Francisco Bay Area

References

External links

Rivers of Sonoma County, California
Sonoma Mountains
Tributaries of the Petaluma River
Rivers of Northern California